Canada competed at the 2015 World Aquatics Championships in Kazan, Russia from 24 July to 9 August 2015.

Medalists

Diving

Canada qualified a full team of 8 divers.

Men

Women

Mixed

High diving

Canada qualified one high diver to compete at the World Championships.

Open water swimming

Canada has fielded a team of four swimmers to compete in the open water marathon.

Swimming

Canadian swimmers earned qualifying standards in the following events (up to a maximum of 2 swimmers in each event at the A-standard entry time, and 1 at the B-standard):

Men

Women

Mixed

Synchronized swimming

Thirteen Canadian synchronized swimmers (one male and twelve female) have been selected to compete in the following events at the World Championships.

Women

* Reserves

Mixed

Water polo

Men's tournament

Canada qualified a men's team.

Team roster

Robin Randall
Con Kudaba
Oliver Vikalo
Nicolas Constantin-Bicari
Justin Boyd
David Lapins
Alec Taschereau
Kevin Graham
Matt Halajian
John Conway
George Torakis
Jerry McElroy
Dusan Aleksic

Group play

Playoffs

9th–12th place semifinals

Ninth place game

Women's tournament

Canada's qualified a women's team.

Team roster

Jessica Gaudreault
Krystina Alogbo
Katrina Monton
Emma Wright
Monika Eggens
Kelly McKee
Joëlle Békhazi
Shae Fournier
Carmen Eggens
Christine Robinson
Stephanie Valin
Dominique Perreault
Nicola Colterjohn

Group play

Playoffs

9th–12th place semifinals

Eleventh place game

References

External links
Official website

Nations at the 2015 World Aquatics Championships
2015
World Aquatics Championships